Petr Galuška (born 8 July 1996) is a Czech professional football forward. He previously played for Slovácko and Karviná in the Czech First League or Pohronie in the Fortuna Liga.

References

External links

1996 births
Living people
People from Hodonín District
Czech footballers
Czech expatriate footballers
Czech Republic youth international footballers
Czech Republic under-21 international footballers
Association football forwards
1. FC Slovácko players
MFK Karviná players
FK Viktoria Žižkov players
GKS Jastrzębie players
FC Slavoj Vyšehrad players
FK Pohronie players
FK Hodonín players
Czech First League players
Czech National Football League players
I liga players
Slovak Super Liga players
Czech Fourth Division players
Expatriate footballers in Poland
Expatriate footballers in Slovakia
Czech expatriate sportspeople in Poland
Czech expatriate sportspeople in Slovakia
Sportspeople from the South Moravian Region